The Santa Cruz Island sator (Sceloporus angustus) is a species of phrynosomatid lizard
found on Santa Cruz Island, in the Gulf of California, Baja California, Mexico. S. angustus seems to be found throughout both islands of Santa Cruz, exploiting a great variety of temperate habitats, such as rocky areas, caves along beaches, areas of beach cobblestones, and sandy substrates, with animals also seen on the branches of small bushes and the limbs of cardones (cacti).

References

Further reading
Dickerson MC (1919). "Diagnoses of twenty-three new species and a new genus of lizards from Lower California". Bull. American Mus. Nat. Hist. 41 (10): 461–477. (Sator angustus, new species, p. 469).

Sceloporus
Reptiles described in 1919
Taxa named by Mary Cynthia Dickerson